Gymnopilus terrestris is a species of agaric fungus in the family Hymenogastraceae.

Description
The species is inedible.

Distribution and habitat
Gymnopilus terrestris grows on soil and humus, under conifers. It has been found in the US states of Michigan, Colorado, Idaho, Washington, and Oregon, fruiting from June to October.

See also

List of Gymnopilus species

References

terrestris
Fungi of North America
Inedible fungi
Taxa named by Lexemuel Ray Hesler
Fungi described in 1969